Elections to the French National Assembly were held in French Sudan on 10 November 1946 as part of the wider French parliamentary elections. Three members were elected, with the Sudanese Progressive Party winning two seats (taken by Fily Dabo Sissoko and Jean Silvandre) and the Sudanese Union – African Democratic Rally one (Mamadou Konaté).

Results

References

1946 in French Sudan
1946 11
French Sudan
French Sudan